A by-election was held for the New South Wales Legislative Assembly electorate of East Sydney on 17 February 1865 because Charles Cowper had been appointed Premier and Colonial Secretary, forming the fourth Cowper ministry. Such ministerial by-elections were usually uncontested however on this occasion a poll was required in East Sydney, The Glebe (Thomas Smart) and  West Sydney (John Darvall and John Robertson). Each minister was comfortably re-elected. Only The Paterson (William Arnold) was uncontested.

Frederick Birmingham was a surveyor and engineer from Parramatta, who was an unsuccessful candidate for Parramatta at the election in November 1864, polling just 16 votes (1.3%)

Dates

Result

Charles Cowper had been appointed Premier and Colonial Secretary, forming the fourth Cowper ministry.

See also
Electoral results for the district of East Sydney
List of New South Wales state by-elections

References

1865 elections in Australia
New South Wales state by-elections
1860s in New South Wales